A stun gun is a device used to immobilize an attacker without causing serious injury. Tasers, tranquillizer guns, and mace (spray) are all types of stun guns. Subcategories of stun gun include the electroshock weapon, an incapacitating weapon that momentarily disables either a beast or a person with an electric shock; and a directed-energy weapon that causes unconsciousness, a weapon that emits energy in an aimed direction without a projectile. Stun guns are frequently used by members of various armed forces and law enforcement agencies. The Multi-purpose stun gun was patented in 2014 in the United States by Hung-Yi Chang. The term is also used for various weapons in science fiction.

See also

 Non-lethal weapon

References

Non-lethal weapons